Percassa is a genus of short-horned grasshoppers in the family Acrididae. There is one described species in Percassa, P. rugifrons, found in Australia.

References

External links

 

Acrididae